Ensign Hosmer Kellogg (July 6, 1812 – January 23, 1882) was a U.S. lawyer, businessman, and politician. He was a member of the Massachusetts House of Representatives and Massachusetts Senate. In 1850, he served as Speaker of the Massachusetts House of Representatives.

Early life
Kellogg was born in July 1812 to Elisha and Jane (Saxton) Kellogg in Sheffield, Massachusetts.

Business career
Kellogg was president of the Western Massachusetts Insurance Company from 1857 to 1865, and the Berkshire Agricultural Society in 1860 and 1861. Kellogg was both president of the Pontoosuc Woolen Company from 1861, and of the Agricultural National Bank from 1866, until his death in 1882. Kellogg also developed the Morningside neighborhood to the north of Pittsfield's downtown.

Public service career

Massachusetts House of Representatives
Kellogg was a member of the Massachusetts House of Representatives in 1843, 1844, 1849-1851 and 1870-1871, also in 1850 Kellogg was Speaker of Massachusetts House.

Massachusetts State Senate
Kellogg was in the Massachusetts State Senate in 1853-1854 and in 1877.

1860 Republican National Convention
Kellogg was a delegate to the 1860 Republican National Convention.

Fisheries commission
In 1876, Kellogg was appointed by President Rutherford B. Hayes to serve as a member of the Halifax Fisheries Commission.

Death
Kellogg died after a brief illness in Pittsfield, Massachusetts, on January 23, 1882.

See also
 1850 Massachusetts legislature
 1876 Massachusetts legislature
 1877 Massachusetts legislature

References

Speakers of the Massachusetts House of Representatives
Politicians from Pittsfield, Massachusetts
People from Sheffield, Massachusetts
Amherst College alumni
American bankers
Massachusetts lawyers
Massachusetts Whigs
19th-century American politicians
Republican Party members of the Massachusetts House of Representatives
Massachusetts state senators
1812 births
1882 deaths
American Congregationalists
19th-century American lawyers
19th-century American businesspeople